John Richard Garland  (January 1, 1918 – March 14, 1964) was a Canadian politician, who was a longtime member of the House of Commons of Canada for the riding of Nipissing. He was a member of the Liberal Party of Canada.

Garland was first elected in 1949, when incumbent member Léo Gauthier moved to represent the new Sudbury riding. He was reelected in every subsequent election until his death in 1964.

Garland was appointed Minister of National Revenue in the government of Lester Pearson in 1963, and held that cabinet position when he died. He was given a state funeral.

As a member of the Queen's Privy Council for Canada he was entitled to use the honorific The Honourable.

The airport in North Bay is named Jack Garland Airport and John Garland Boulevard in Toronto were named in his memory.

External links

1918 births
1964 deaths
Liberal Party of Canada MPs
Members of the House of Commons of Canada from Ontario
Members of the King's Privy Council for Canada
People from North Bay, Ontario